Routine Maintenance is the second full-length studio album by American folk rock project Aaron West and the Roaring Twenties. Released on May 10, 2019 via Hopeless Records, the album follows the concept begun with We Don't Have Each Other (2014).

Background
In March 2019, Dan Campbell announced two Aaron West tours, as well as a new album. The announcement was accompanied by a brief teaser video, using home movie footage and instrumental music. Later that month, the project released a music video for the album's first single, "Runnin' Toward the Light." Two more singles, "Just Sign the Papers" and "Bury Me Anywhere Else," were released in advance of the full album's debut on May 10, 2019.

In an interview with Rock Sound, Campbell said, "There is a redemption arc built into this album. I really wanted to focus on Aaron growing as a person and understanding how to better cope with tragedy instead of just shutting down and being self-destructive and self-absorbed and self-obsessed."

Reception 
Routine Maintenance was released to critical acclaim. Sputnikmusic staffer Channing Freeman rated the album as 4.5 out of 5, declaring it "[m]ore than a side project and much more than a story."

Two Dead Press reviewers shortlisted the album for their list of the top ten albums of 2019.

Track listing

Credits and personnel 

Aaron West and the Roaring Twenties
 Dan "Soupy" Campbell – vocals, guitar, keyboards, harmonica

Additional personnel
 Ace Enders – double bass, guitar, keyboards, banjo, lap steel guitar, additional vocals
 John Becker – guitar
 Nick Steinborn – drums
 Gabe Valle – violin
 Nate Sander – viola
 Kristine Kruta – cello
 Juan Lopez – trumpet
 Chiemena E. Ukazim – saxophone
 Dom Maggi, Joe Marro, Ryan Pinkowitz, Emma Wuillermin, Robin Wuillermin – additional vocals

Production
 Ace Enders – producer, engineer, mixing
 Nik Bruzzese, Dom Maggi – additional engineering
 Alan Douches – mastering
 Joe Marro, Lesser Matters – management

References

2019 albums
Hopeless Records albums